Sphenoptera is a genus of beetles in the family Buprestidae, containing the following species:

 Sphenoptera abbreviata Jakovlev, 1900
 Sphenoptera abyssinica Thomson, 1878
 Sphenoptera accheleana Obenberger, 1939
 Sphenoptera acerba Théry, 1929
 Sphenoptera achardi Obenberger, 1926
 Sphenoptera acuminata Jakovlev, 1898
 Sphenoptera adelphina Thomson, 1878
 Sphenoptera adiana Kerremans, 1907
 Sphenoptera adumbrata Jakovlev, 1902
 Sphenoptera aello Obenberger, 1926
 Sphenoptera aemula Jakovlev, 1902
 Sphenoptera aeneella Kerremans, 1913
 Sphenoptera aeneiventris Jakovlev, 1886
 Sphenoptera aeneomicans Kraatz in Heyden & Kraatz, 1882
 Sphenoptera aequalis Kerremans, 1913
 Sphenoptera aerata Jakovlev, 1887
 Sphenoptera aerosa (Gmelin, 1790)
 Sphenoptera aeruginea (Gory, 1841)
 Sphenoptera aesopus Kerremans, 1913
 Sphenoptera aethiopica Obenberger, 1926
 Sphenoptera afflicta Jakovlev, 1900
 Sphenoptera akrae Obenberger, 1926
 Sphenoptera alcides Reitter, 1900
 Sphenoptera alcmaeone Obenberger, 1926
 Sphenoptera alexeevi Kalashian & Volkovitsh, 1993
 Sphenoptera aliena Jakovlev, 1900
 Sphenoptera alluaudi Théry, 1910
 Sphenoptera altaica Cobos, 1968
 Sphenoptera alternecostata Jakovlev, 1903
 Sphenoptera althaeae Obenberger, 1929
 Sphenoptera amabilis Kerremans, 1919
 Sphenoptera amasica Obenberger, 1927
 Sphenoptera amatina Kerremans, 1913
 Sphenoptera ambigua (Klug, 1829)
 Sphenoptera amica Kerremans, 1913
 Sphenoptera amicalis Obenberger, 1926
 Sphenoptera amitina Jakovlev, 1908
 Sphenoptera amoena Jakovlev, 1901
 Sphenoptera ampla Obenberger, 1926
 Sphenoptera amplicollis Jakovlev, 1899
 Sphenoptera anchorata Bílý, 1996
 Sphenoptera andamanensis Waterhouse, 1877
 Sphenoptera andreinii Kerremans, 1907
 Sphenoptera andrewesi Kerremans, 1893
 Sphenoptera antennata Kerremans, 1913
 Sphenoptera anthaxoides Reitter, 1895
 Sphenoptera anthracina Jakovlev, 1887
 Sphenoptera antilibanensis Obenberger, 1952
 Sphenoptera antiqua (Illiger, 1803)
 Sphenoptera antoinei Théry, 1930
 Sphenoptera antoniae Reitter, 1891
 Sphenoptera aperta Jakovlev, 1903
 Sphenoptera aportata Obenberger, 1920
 Sphenoptera applanata Obenberger, 1926
 Sphenoptera apposita Obenberger, 1926
 Sphenoptera arabica Gory, 1841
 Sphenoptera aradica Niehuis, 2009
 Sphenoptera arambourgi Théry, 1939
 Sphenoptera araxidis Reitter, 1890
 Sphenoptera arcana Jakovlev, 1908
 Sphenoptera archimedes Théry, 1934
 Sphenoptera arcuata Kerremans, 1913
 Sphenoptera ardens (Klug, 1829)
 Sphenoptera ardua Gory & Laporte, 1839
 Sphenoptera areata Jakovlev, 1887
 Sphenoptera arguta (Jakovlev, 1900)
 Sphenoptera armena (Steven, 1830)
 Sphenoptera armillata Jakovlev, 1908
 Sphenoptera arnoldi Théry, 1931
 Sphenoptera arnoldii Alexeev, 1975
 Sphenoptera arrowi Obenberger, 1926
 Sphenoptera artamonovi Jakovlev, 1900
 Sphenoptera artemisiae Reitter, 1889
 Sphenoptera ascarorum Obenberger, 1926
 Sphenoptera ashantica Obenberger, 1926
 Sphenoptera astronomica Obenberger, 1926
 Sphenoptera astuta Jakovlev, 1898
 Sphenoptera asumarina Kerremans, 1913
 Sphenoptera aterrima Kerremans, 1913
 Sphenoptera atomaria (Thunberg, 1789)
 Sphenoptera atomarioides Obenberger, 1926
 Sphenoptera atra Kerremans, 1899
 Sphenoptera attenuata Jakovlev, 1902
 Sphenoptera aureola Jakovlev, 1902
 Sphenoptera auriceps Jakovlev, 1886
 Sphenoptera auricollis Kerremans, 1892
 Sphenoptera aurulenta Gory & Laporte, 1839
 Sphenoptera badeni Kerremans, 1913
 Sphenoptera balassogloi Jakovlev, 1885
 Sphenoptera banghaasi Obenberger, 1915
 Sphenoptera bantuensis Obenberger, 1916
 Sphenoptera barbarica (Gmelin, 1790)
 Sphenoptera barbata Jakovlev, 1887
 Sphenoptera basalis Morawitz, 1861
 Sphenoptera battinii Théry, 1932
 Sphenoptera baumanni Niehuis, 1999
 Sphenoptera baumi Obenberger, 1928
 Sphenoptera bayoni Kerremans, 1910
 Sphenoptera bechuana Thomson, 1879
 Sphenoptera bedeli Abeille de Perrin, 1909
 Sphenoptera beesoni Obenberger, 1926
 Sphenoptera behanzini Théry, 1911
 Sphenoptera bellatrix Obenberger, 1927
 Sphenoptera bequaerti Kerremans, 1913
 Sphenoptera berbera Obenberger, 1924
 Sphenoptera bergevini Théry, 1922
 Sphenoptera bertheloti Paiva, 1862
 Sphenoptera bettoni Kerremans, 1913
 Sphenoptera bicarinata Jakovlev, 1887
 Sphenoptera bifoveolata Marseul, 1866
 Sphenoptera bifulgida Reitter, 1898
 Sphenoptera bilyana Niehuis, 2002
 Sphenoptera bilyi Bellamy, 1998
 Sphenoptera birmanica Kerremans, 1913
 Sphenoptera biskrensis Jakovlev, 1903
 Sphenoptera blanda Jakovlev, 1902
 Sphenoptera boanoi Curletti & Magnani, 1988
 Sphenoptera bodemeyeri Jakovlev, 1900
 Sphenoptera bodongi Kerremans, 1913
 Sphenoptera boera Obenberger, 1926
 Sphenoptera bogosina Obenberger, 1924
 Sphenoptera bohemanii Thomson, 1878
 Sphenoptera boisduvali Obenberger, 1927
 Sphenoptera bombayensis Obenberger, 1926
 Sphenoptera bonvouloiri Obenberger, 1924
 Sphenoptera bouvieri Kerremans, 1913
 Sphenoptera bradshawi Kerremans, 1913
 Sphenoptera brandli Niehuis, 2001
 Sphenoptera braunsi Théry, 1930
 Sphenoptera brechteli Niehuis, 2003
 Sphenoptera breindli Obenberger, 1926
 Sphenoptera brevior Pic, 1896
 Sphenoptera brincki Descarpentries, 1970
 Sphenoptera bronzeola Obenberger, 1926
 Sphenoptera brussae Obenberger, 1927
 Sphenoptera brydli Obenberger, 1926
 Sphenoptera bucharica Jakovlev, 1900
 Sphenoptera burgeoni Théry, 1940
 Sphenoptera buxtoni Théry, 1941
 Sphenoptera caesia Jakovlev, 1904
 Sphenoptera cafrariae Kerremans, 1914
 Sphenoptera calligoni Kalashian & Volkovitsh, 1997
 Sphenoptera camerunica Kerremans, 1903
 Sphenoptera campanai Théry, 1946
 Sphenoptera campicola Boheman, 1860
 Sphenoptera canaliculata (Pallas, 1781)
 Sphenoptera candezei Obenberger, 1926
 Sphenoptera candida Kerremans, 1913
 Sphenoptera canescens Motshulsky, 1860
 Sphenoptera capensis Gory & Laporte, 1839
 Sphenoptera capicola Thomson, 1878
 Sphenoptera capigena Obenberger, 1926
 Sphenoptera capitata Kerremans, 1913
 Sphenoptera cara Kerremans, 1914
 Sphenoptera carpenteriana Théry, 1937
 Sphenoptera catopyra Obenberger, 1926
 Sphenoptera caudata Théry, 1941
 Sphenoptera cauta Jakovlev, 1904
 Sphenoptera chalcoglypta Obenberger, 1926
 Sphenoptera chalybaea Ménétriés, 1848
 Sphenoptera chappuisi Théry, 1939
 Sphenoptera chaudoiri Obenberger, 1930
 Sphenoptera cheloukensis Thomson, 1878
 Sphenoptera chembae Théry, 1934
 Sphenoptera chimaera Obenberger, 1926
 Sphenoptera chinensis Kerremans, 1898
 Sphenoptera chiperonica Obenberger, 1926
 Sphenoptera chlorocyanea Obenberger, 1926
 Sphenoptera chobauti Abeille de Perrin, 1897
 Sphenoptera chrysostoma Gory & Laporte, 1839
 Sphenoptera chubhi Obenberger, 1926
 Sphenoptera chudeaui Obenberger, 1926
 Sphenoptera chusistanica Obenberger, 1926
 Sphenoptera clancula Obenberger, 1926
 Sphenoptera clara Kerremans, 1898
 Sphenoptera clarescens Kerremans, 1909
 Sphenoptera clavareaui Kerremans, 1903
 Sphenoptera cobosi Alexeev in Alexeev & Volkovitsh, 1989
 Sphenoptera coeca Kerremans, 1898
 Sphenoptera coelata Théry, 1946
 Sphenoptera coerulea Jakovlev, 1898
 Sphenoptera collaris Harold, 1878
 Sphenoptera collecta Obenberger, 1926
 Sphenoptera colmanti Kerremans, 1903
 Sphenoptera colorata Kerremans, 1914
 Sphenoptera comes Kerremans, 1898
 Sphenoptera commixta Obenberger, 1927
 Sphenoptera confinis Jakovlev, 1893
 Sphenoptera conformis Kerremans, 1913
 Sphenoptera congener Kerremans, 1898
 Sphenoptera congolana Kerremans, 1903
 Sphenoptera conjuncta Jakovlev, 1900
 Sphenoptera consors Kerremans, 1913
 Sphenoptera convexa Kerremans, 1898
 Sphenoptera convexidorsis Obenberger, 1926
 Sphenoptera convexifrons Obenberger, 1926
 Sphenoptera convicta Jakovlev, 1900
 Sphenoptera coracina (Steven, 1830)
 Sphenoptera cornui Théry, 1895
 Sphenoptera costata Jakovlev, 1905
 Sphenoptera cowlandi Théry, 1930
 Sphenoptera crassa Kerremans, 1898
 Sphenoptera crassicollis Théry, 1931
 Sphenoptera crassula Obenberger, 1926
 Sphenoptera crebepunctata Kerremans, 1892
 Sphenoptera cribratipennis Escalera, 1914
 Sphenoptera cunea Marseul, 1866
 Sphenoptera cuneiformis Gory, 1841
 Sphenoptera cupida Kerremans, 1913
 Sphenoptera cupreella Kerremans, 1913
 Sphenoptera cupreosplendens (Gory & Laporte, 1839)
 Sphenoptera cupricollis Kerremans, 1914
 Sphenoptera cupricolor Obenberger, 1926
 Sphenoptera cuprifrons Faldermann, 1835
 Sphenoptera cuprina Motschulsky, 1860
 Sphenoptera cursor Kerremans, 1913
 Sphenoptera curta Jakovlev, 1885
 Sphenoptera curtula Kerremans, 1893
 Sphenoptera cuvieri Obenberger, 1926
 Sphenoptera cyanea Jakovlev, 1898
 Sphenoptera cyaneoniger Kerremans, 1909
 Sphenoptera cyaniceps Kerremans, 1890
 Sphenoptera cyanipes Quedenfeldt, 1886
 Sphenoptera cyaniventris Obenberger, 1927
 Sphenoptera cybele Obenberger, 1926
 Sphenoptera cylindrica Kerremans, 1898
 Sphenoptera cylindricollis Marseul, 1866
 Sphenoptera cyphogastra Jakovlev, 1900
 Sphenoptera dadkhani Obenberger, 1955
 Sphenoptera dakkarensis Obenberger, 1928
 Sphenoptera damarana Kerremans, 1913
 Sphenoptera danieli Jakovlev, 1900
 Sphenoptera danilevskyi Kalashian, 2002
 Sphenoptera davatchii Descarpentries, 1960
 Sphenoptera davidis Théry, 1928
 Sphenoptera decemcostata Théry, 1941
 Sphenoptera decens Jakovlev, 1903
 Sphenoptera decorsei Kerremans, 1913
 Sphenoptera deducta Kerremans, 1892
 Sphenoptera delecta Kerremans, 1913
 Sphenoptera delegorguei Thomson, 1878
 Sphenoptera delestrei Kerremans, 1913
 Sphenoptera demeryi Théry, 1935
 Sphenoptera demissa Marseul, 1866
 Sphenoptera demota Kerremans, 1913
 Sphenoptera densesculpta Jakovlev, 1908
 Sphenoptera dentata Théry, 1932
 Sphenoptera denticauda Jakovlev, 1902
 Sphenoptera deobani Obenberger, 1926
 Sphenoptera depressa Kerremans, 1892
 Sphenoptera depressicollis Kerremans, 1913
 Sphenoptera depressiuscula Obenberger, 1927
 Sphenoptera desertorum Obenberger, 1926
 Sphenoptera deudoroides Obenberger, 1926
 Sphenoptera devorans Obenberger, 1927
 Sphenoptera deyrollei Thomson, 1878
 Sphenoptera diabolica Obenberger, 1915
 Sphenoptera diana Kerremans, 1913
 Sphenoptera dichrosoma Obenberger, 1926
 Sphenoptera differens Kerremans, 1913
 Sphenoptera difficilis Kerremans, 1913
 Sphenoptera diffinis (Klug, 1835)
 Sphenoptera diluta Jakovlev, 1900
 Sphenoptera dino Obenberger, 1926
 Sphenoptera disjuncta Fåhraeus in Boheman, 1851
 Sphenoptera dispar Kerremans, 1899
 Sphenoptera dissimilis Kerremans, 1898
 Sphenoptera divergens Kerremans, 1898
 Sphenoptera diversa Gory, 1841
 Sphenoptera divisa Kerremans, 1913
 Sphenoptera docilis Kerremans, 1914
 Sphenoptera dollmani Obenberger, 1926
 Sphenoptera donata Obenberger, 1929
 Sphenoptera dongolensis (Klug, 1829)
 Sphenoptera dorsalis Kerremans, 1913
 Sphenoptera dubia Saunders, 1871
 Sphenoptera dudai Obenberger, 1926
 Sphenoptera dumolinii Gory, 1841
 Sphenoptera dumonti Théry, 1922
 Sphenoptera durandi Kerremans, 1913
 Sphenoptera dushakensis Kalashian, 1994
 Sphenoptera duvivieri Kerremans, 1898
 Sphenoptera ebenina Jakovlev, 1900
 Sphenoptera eddin Jakovlev, 1903
 Sphenoptera edmundi Jakovlev, 1900
 Sphenoptera egena Mannerheim, 1837
 Sphenoptera egregia Jakovlev, 1901
 Sphenoptera elateroides (Théry, 1901)
 Sphenoptera electra Obenberger, 1926
 Sphenoptera elegantula Obenberger, 1926
 Sphenoptera elliptica Théry, 1911
 Sphenoptera elongata Kerremans, 1913
 Sphenoptera elpha Obenberger, 1926
 Sphenoptera eminens Obenberger, 1926
 Sphenoptera ennediana Descarpentries & Mateu, 1965
 Sphenoptera enyo Obenberger, 1926
 Sphenoptera enyuseki Obenberger, 1927
 Sphenoptera eone Obenberger, 1926
 Sphenoptera epistomalis Obenberger, 1927
 Sphenoptera eroylandusica Zykov & Alexeev, 1993
 Sphenoptera erudita Kerremans, 1914
 Sphenoptera erytraeina Kerremans, 1907
 Sphenoptera eucephala Obenberger, 1926
 Sphenoptera eugenii Jakovlev, 1898
 Sphenoptera euplecta Obenberger, 1927
 Sphenoptera exarata (Fischer von Waldheim, 1824)
 Sphenoptera excavata Faldermann, 1835
 Sphenoptera exigua Jakovlev, 1908
 Sphenoptera exoleta Jakovlev, 1908
 Sphenoptera extensocarinata Jakovlev, 1889
 Sphenoptera fabricii Obenberger, 1926
 Sphenoptera factiosa Kerremans, 1914
 Sphenoptera fahrei Kerremans, 1911
 Sphenoptera fallatrix Obenberger, 1927
 Sphenoptera fallax Fåhraeus in Boheman, 1851
 Sphenoptera faragi Théry, 1936
 Sphenoptera felix Kerremans, 1913
 Sphenoptera fellah Thomson, 1878
 Sphenoptera fidelis Kerremans, 1899
 Sphenoptera filistina Obenberger, 1927
 Sphenoptera finitima Jakovlev, 1908
 Sphenoptera fischeri Kerremans, 1913
 Sphenoptera fissifrons Marseul, 1866
 Sphenoptera foexi Théry, 1931
 Sphenoptera formosa Jakovlev, 1902
 Sphenoptera formosula Obenberger, 1927
 Sphenoptera fossa Kerremans, 1909
 Sphenoptera fossicollis Quedenfeldt, 1886
 Sphenoptera fossiger Kerremans, 1913
 Sphenoptera fossiventris Kerremans, 1914
 Sphenoptera fourie Bellamy, 2004
 Sphenoptera foveicollis Théry, 1946
 Sphenoptera foveipennis Quedenfeldt, 1888
 Sphenoptera foveola (Gebler, 1825)
 Sphenoptera freyi Théry, 1942
 Sphenoptera frivaldszkyi Obenberger, 1963
 Sphenoptera frontalis Thomson, 1878
 Sphenoptera fulgens Gory, 1841
 Sphenoptera fulgidiceps Kerremans, 1892
 Sphenoptera fulgidiventris Kerremans, 1913
 Sphenoptera fulminiceps Obenberger, 1928
 Sphenoptera furcatipennis Gory & Laporte, 1839
 Sphenoptera fusca Kerremans, 1913
 Sphenoptera fusiformis Kerremans, 1913
 Sphenoptera gahani Kerremans, 1913
 Sphenoptera galkae Kalahsian & Volkovitsh, 2009
 Sphenoptera galobulloni Español & Sanpere, 1947
 Sphenoptera gastoni (Théry, 1904)
 Sphenoptera gedyei Théry, 1941
 Sphenoptera geghardica Kalashian & Zykov, 1994
 Sphenoptera gehini Obenberger, 1926
 Sphenoptera gemma Obenberger, 1926
 Sphenoptera gemmata (Olivier, 1790)
 Sphenoptera georgiella Obenberger, 1939
 Sphenoptera gestroi Kerremans, 1913
 Sphenoptera gibbosa Kerremans, 1903
 Sphenoptera gibbosula Obenberger, 1926
 Sphenoptera gigantea Heer, 1847
 Sphenoptera gilli Obenberger, 1926
 Sphenoptera gillmani Obenberger, 1926
 Sphenoptera glasunovi Jakovlev, 1903
 Sphenoptera glyphoderes Abeille de Perrin, 1901
 Sphenoptera gnidiaphaga Bellamy in Bellamy & Scholtz, 1986
 Sphenoptera goetzeana Kerremans, 1913
 Sphenoptera gonyoxys Abeille de Perrin, 1909
 Sphenoptera gordoni Obenberger, 1927
 Sphenoptera gossypicida Obenberger, 1927
 Sphenoptera gossypicida Obenberger, 1927
 Sphenoptera gossypii Kerremans, 1892
 Sphenoptera gracilis Jakovlev, 1900
 Sphenoptera gracillima Obenberger, 1926
 Sphenoptera gradli Obenberger, 1926
 Sphenoptera grandicollis Théry, 1937
 Sphenoptera granulicollis Théry, 1946
 Sphenoptera grata (Jakovlev, 1904)
 Sphenoptera gratiosa Obenberger, 1926
 Sphenoptera gravida Jakovlev, 1902
 Sphenoptera gridellii Obenberger, 940b
 Sphenoptera grotsi Obenberger, 1926
 Sphenoptera guillarmodi Descarpentries, 1970
 Sphenoptera guningi Kerremans, 1911
 Sphenoptera gustata Kerremans, 1914
 Sphenoptera hahni Obenberger, 1926
 Sphenoptera halperini Niehuis, 2001
 Sphenoptera hamata Jakovlev, 1900
 Sphenoptera hammadae Kalashian & Volkovitsh, 1997
 Sphenoptera haroldi Jakovlev, 1902
 Sphenoptera harrarensis Obenberger, 1926
 Sphenoptera hauseri Reitter, 1895
 Sphenoptera hayeki Kalashian & Volkovitsh, 2007
 Sphenoptera helena Obenberger, 1926
 Sphenoptera helferi Obenberger, 1926
 Sphenoptera helvetiorum Théry, 1946
 Sphenoptera heracles Obenberger, 1926
 Sphenoptera herbivora Obenberger, 1926
 Sphenoptera heroica Jakovlev, 1903
 Sphenoptera hetita Obenberger, 1927
 Sphenoptera heydeni Gredler, 1878
 Sphenoptera heynei Obenberger, 1916
 Sphenoptera heyrovskyi Obenberger, 1924
 Sphenoptera himalayensis Théry, 1911
 Sphenoptera hispidula Reitter, 1890
 Sphenoptera holiki Obenberger, 1926
 Sphenoptera holubi Obenberger, 1926
 Sphenoptera honesta Kerremans, 1914
 Sphenoptera honorabilis Obenberger, 1926
 Sphenoptera hopkinsi Théry, 1932
 Sphenoptera hoplisturoides Obenberger, 1916
 Sphenoptera horni Théry, 1904
 Sphenoptera howa Nonfried, 1892
 Sphenoptera humilis Kerremans, 1898
 Sphenoptera hypocrita Mannerheim, 1837
 Sphenoptera hypomelaena Obenberger, 1926
 Sphenoptera hypsibata Obenberger, 1927
 Sphenoptera idonea Jakovlev, 1908
 Sphenoptera ignescens Escalera, 1914
 Sphenoptera igniceps Jakovlev, 1886
 Sphenoptera ignita Reitter, 1895
 Sphenoptera ignota Kerremans, 1913
 Sphenoptera illata Obenberger, 1926
 Sphenoptera illucens Jakovlev, 1902
 Sphenoptera imitabilis Kerremans, 1914
 Sphenoptera impar Kerremans, 1913
 Sphenoptera impressifrons Fairmaire, 1875
 Sphenoptera improvisa Jakovlev, 1902
 Sphenoptera incerta Jakovlev, 1887
 Sphenoptera inclinata Kerremans, 1913
 Sphenoptera incola Kerremans, 1913
 Sphenoptera inculta Obenberger, 1929
 Sphenoptera indica Gory & Laporte, 1839
 Sphenoptera indurata Obenberger, 1926
 Sphenoptera inermis Kerremans, 1898
 Sphenoptera infantula Reitter, 1895
 Sphenoptera inferna Obenberger, 1926
 Sphenoptera infrasplendens Kerremans, 1913
 Sphenoptera inimica Obenberger, 1924
 Sphenoptera innocua Kerremans, 1892
 Sphenoptera inquisita Obenberger, 1926
 Sphenoptera insidiosa Mannerheim, 1852
 Sphenoptera insignis Kerremans, 1913
 Sphenoptera insipida Kerremans, 1898
 Sphenoptera intaminata Jakovlev, 1908
 Sphenoptera integrata Jakovlev, 1902
 Sphenoptera intermixta Quedenfeldt, 1886
 Sphenoptera intervallica Obenberger, 1926
 Sphenoptera intima Obenberger, 1926
 Sphenoptera intorta Obenberger, 1926
 Sphenoptera inventa Obenberger, 1926
 Sphenoptera investigata Obenberger, 1926
 Sphenoptera inveterata Obenberger, 1926
 Sphenoptera invicta Obenberger, 1926
 Sphenoptera inviolata Obenberger, 1926
 Sphenoptera iringae Obenberger, 1926
 Sphenoptera irregularis Jakovlev, 1886
 Sphenoptera irrevocata Obenberger, 1926
 Sphenoptera isipingi Obenberger, 1926
 Sphenoptera isis Jakovlev, 1901
 Sphenoptera israelita Théry, 1930
 Sphenoptera jacobsonorum Kalahsian & Volkovitsh, 2009
 Sphenoptera jakowlewi Reitter, 1895
 Sphenoptera jokoensis Obenberger, 1920
 Sphenoptera jordani Abeille de Perrin, 1909
 Sphenoptera jousseaumei Kerremans, 1913
 Sphenoptera jubana Gestro, 1895
 Sphenoptera jugoslavica Obenberger, 1926
 Sphenoptera jugulata Fairmaire, 1882
 Sphenoptera kasimi Théry, 1936
 Sphenoptera kassaiensis Kerremans, 1903
 Sphenoptera katangae Kerremans, 1913
 Sphenoptera kaznakovi Jakovlev, 1899
 Sphenoptera kepelensis Alexeev & Zykov, 1992
 Sphenoptera kermanshahensis Obenberger, 1952
 Sphenoptera kerremansi Jakovlev, 1901
 Sphenoptera kerzhneri Volkovitsh & Kalashian, 2001
 Sphenoptera khamae Obenberger, 1926
 Sphenoptera khartoumensis Obenberger, 1927
 Sphenoptera kheili Obenberger, 1926
 Sphenoptera khnzoriani Kalashian, 1996
 Sphenoptera khosrovica Kalashian, 1990
 Sphenoptera kiachtae Obenberger, 1952
 Sphenoptera kimberleyensis Obenberger, 1926
 Sphenoptera klapperichi Cobos, 1966
 Sphenoptera kleinei Obenberger, 1926
 Sphenoptera knopi Heyden & Heyden, 1865
 Sphenoptera koenigi Jakovlev, 1890
 Sphenoptera kolbei Kerremans, 1913
 Sphenoptera komareki Obenberger, 1926
 Sphenoptera konbirensis Kerremans, 1892
 Sphenoptera korshinskii Jakovlev, 1900
 Sphenoptera kozlowi Jakovlev, 1900
 Sphenoptera krali Obenberger, 1927
 Sphenoptera krisna Obenberger, 1926
 Sphenoptera kristenseni Obenberger, 1926
 Sphenoptera kruperi Jakovlev, 1887
 Sphenoptera kryzhanovskii Alexeev in Alexeev, et al., 1991
 Sphenoptera kulzeri Théry, 1942
 Sphenoptera kuntzeni Obenberger, 1926
 Sphenoptera kuvanguensis Théry, 1946
 Sphenoptera kyselyi Obenberger, 1926
 Sphenoptera lacustris Kerremans, 1913
 Sphenoptera laesicollis Abeille de Perrin, 1909
 Sphenoptera laetula Obenberger, 1926
 Sphenoptera lafertei Thomson, 1878
 Sphenoptera lalage Obenberger, 1927
 Sphenoptera lamarcki Obenberger, 1926
 Sphenoptera lameerei Kerremans, 1913
 Sphenoptera lapidaria (Brullé, 1832)
 Sphenoptera laplumei Kerremans, 1912
 Sphenoptera laportei Saunders, 1871
 Sphenoptera lara Obenberger, 1926
 Sphenoptera larva Kerremans, 1913
 Sphenoptera lassa Obenberger, 1926
 Sphenoptera lata Kerremans, 1913
 Sphenoptera lateralis Faldermann, 1836
 Sphenoptera lateripicta Théry, 1946
 Sphenoptera latesulcata Jakovlev, 1886
 Sphenoptera laticeps Jakovlev, 1886
 Sphenoptera laticollis (Olivier, 1790)
 Sphenoptera latifrons Théry, 1955
 Sphenoptera lazarica Obenberger, 1926
 Sphenoptera lecontei Obenberger, 1926
 Sphenoptera lederi Jakovlev, 1890
 Sphenoptera leighi Kerremans, 1911
 Sphenoptera leonensis Nonfried, 1892
 Sphenoptera leonhardi Obenberger, 1927
 Sphenoptera leontievi Jakovlev, 1900
 Sphenoptera lepidula (Théry, 1937)
 Sphenoptera lesnei Kerremans, 1913
 Sphenoptera leventi Kalashian & Volkovitsh, 2007
 Sphenoptera lia Jakovlev, 1901
 Sphenoptera liauteyi Obenberger, 1924
 Sphenoptera libanica Fairmaire, 1881
 Sphenoptera liberica Obenberger, 1926
 Sphenoptera ligulata Jakovlev, 1904
 Sphenoptera limoniastri Théry, 1928
 Sphenoptera lineifrons Kerremans, 1892
 Sphenoptera lineolata Obenberger, 1926
 Sphenoptera livingstoni Obenberger, 1926
 Sphenoptera lloydi Théry, 1947
 Sphenoptera lokayi Obenberger, 1926
 Sphenoptera longa Théry, 1946
 Sphenoptera longicollis Kerremans, 1919
 Sphenoptera longipennis Jakovlev, 1904
 Sphenoptera longispina Théry, 1946
 Sphenoptera longiuscula Gory & Laporte, 1839
 Sphenoptera lopatini Kalashian, 2005
 Sphenoptera loranthiphaga Bellamy in Bellamy & Scholtz, 1986
 Sphenoptera lucidicollis Kraatz in Heyden & Kraatz, 1882
 Sphenoptera lucidula Kerremans, 1899
 Sphenoptera luctifica Jakovlev, 1904
 Sphenoptera luctuosa Thomson, 1878
 Sphenoptera lunigera Quedenfeldt, 1886
 Sphenoptera lutulenta Jakovlev, 1905
 Sphenoptera macarthuri Théry, 1941
 Sphenoptera macta Obenberger, 1926
 Sphenoptera maculata (Gory & Laporte, 1839)
 Sphenoptera maderi Obenberger, 1926
 Sphenoptera madiensis Théry, 1930
 Sphenoptera maga Obenberger, 1927
 Sphenoptera magna Gory & Laporte, 1839
 Sphenoptera magnanii Curletti & Sparacio, 1990
 Sphenoptera maillei Gory & Laporte, 1839
 Sphenoptera maindroni Kerremans, 1913
 Sphenoptera malawiensis Bellamy, 2007
 Sphenoptera malesuada Obenberger, 1926
 Sphenoptera manca Obenberger, 1927
 Sphenoptera mandarina Théry, 1911
 Sphenoptera manderstjernae Jakovlev, 1886
 Sphenoptera manifesta Jakovlev, 1900
 Sphenoptera mannerheimii Saunders, 1871
 Sphenoptera margaritae Volkovitsh & Kalashian, 1994
 Sphenoptera margellanica Kraatz in Heyden & Kraatz, 1882
 Sphenoptera marginicollis Hope, 1831
 Sphenoptera marmottani Théry, 1930
 Sphenoptera marseuliana Obenberger, 1927
 Sphenoptera marseulii Saunders, 1871
 Sphenoptera marshalli Kerremans, 1913
 Sphenoptera martini Kerremans, 1913
 Sphenoptera martinianus Théry, 1938
 Sphenoptera mashuna Kerremans, 1913
 Sphenoptera massarti Théry, 1937
 Sphenoptera matabelica Obenberger, 1926
 Sphenoptera matura Théry, 1932
 Sphenoptera mauretanica Théry, 1930
 Sphenoptera mazuri Holynski, 1997
 Sphenoptera medica Obenberger, 1926
 Sphenoptera mediocris Kerremans, 1893
 Sphenoptera medvedevi Kalashian & Volkovitsh, 2006
 Sphenoptera meigeni Obenberger, 1926
 Sphenoptera melobasina Obenberger, 1926
 Sphenoptera mendosa Théry, 1946
 Sphenoptera meneliki Obenberger, 1926
 Sphenoptera mercedes Obenberger, 1952
 Sphenoptera meridionalis Kerremans, 1913
 Sphenoptera mesopotamica Marseul, 1866
 Sphenoptera methneri Obenberger, 1926
 Sphenoptera micans Jakovlev, 1886
 Sphenoptera mignon Obenberger, 1926
 Sphenoptera mima Kerremans, 1913
 Sphenoptera mimosae Obenberger, 1926
 Sphenoptera mingrelica Obenberger, 1926
 Sphenoptera minuta Meunier, 1915
 Sphenoptera minutissima Desbrochers des Loges, 1870
 Sphenoptera misella Jakovlev, 1900
 Sphenoptera mitroschinae Kalashian & Volkovitsh, 2007
 Sphenoptera mixta Jakovlev, 1887
 Sphenoptera mnemosyne Obenberger, 1926
 Sphenoptera mocquerysi Jakovlev, 1903
 Sphenoptera moesta Jakovlev, 1887
 Sphenoptera moises Obenberger, 1924
 Sphenoptera mokrzeckii Obenberger, 1926
 Sphenoptera molirensis Kerremans, 1898
 Sphenoptera mollandini Théry, 1938
 Sphenoptera monardi Théry, 1946
 Sphenoptera monstrosa Abeille de Perrin, 1907
 Sphenoptera moordriftensis Obenberger, 1926
 Sphenoptera mora Curletti & Magnani, 1992
 Sphenoptera mossulensis Obenberger, 1920
 Sphenoptera motschulskyi Obenberger, 1926
 Sphenoptera mozambicana Obenberger, 1926
 Sphenoptera muehlei Niehuis, 2001
 Sphenoptera muehlheimi Obenberger, 1916
 Sphenoptera mulimae Théry, 1934
 Sphenoptera mutilata Théry, 1929
 Sphenoptera mwengwae Obenberger, 1926
 Sphenoptera mystica Kerremans, 1913
 Sphenoptera nairae Kalashian & Volkovitsh, 2007
 Sphenoptera nana Jakovlev, 1908
 Sphenoptera natalensis Thomson, 1878
 Sphenoptera nausicaa Obenberger, 1927
 Sphenoptera navicula Jakovlev, 1908
 Sphenoptera necatrix Obenberger, 1926
 Sphenoptera nectariphila Obenberger, 1926
 Sphenoptera neglecta (Klug, 1835)
 Sphenoptera nepos Kerremans, 1913
 Sphenoptera nereis Obenberger, 1927
 Sphenoptera nervosa Nonfried, 1892
 Sphenoptera nickerli Obenberger, 1926
 Sphenoptera nigerrima Kerremans, 1893
 Sphenoptera nigmanni Kerremans, 1913
 Sphenoptera nigra Kerremans, 1913
 Sphenoptera nigrescens Thomson, 1878
 Sphenoptera nigripennis Kerremans, 1898
 Sphenoptera nigriventris Théry, 1911
 Sphenoptera nilotica Gory & Laporte, 1839
 Sphenoptera nitens Kerremans, 1898
 Sphenoptera njegus Obenberger, 1916
 Sphenoptera nocens Théry, 1932
 Sphenoptera noctifer Kerremans, 1914
 Sphenoptera notata Jakovlev, 1898
 Sphenoptera notha Abeille de Perrin, 1909
 Sphenoptera nox Jakovlev, 1900
 Sphenoptera noxia Théry, 1932
 Sphenoptera nubiae Obenberger, 1924
 Sphenoptera nyassica Kerremans, 1898
 Sphenoptera obenbergeriana Volkovitsh & Kalashian, 2003
 Sphenoptera obesa Thomson, 1878
 Sphenoptera obesula Obenberger, 1926
 Sphenoptera obockiana Kerremans, 1913
 Sphenoptera obruta Kerremans, 1909
 Sphenoptera obscuriventris Motschulsky, 1860
 Sphenoptera obsti Jakobson, 1912
 Sphenoptera ocularis Kerremans, 1898
 Sphenoptera oculifrons Kerermans, 1899
 Sphenoptera odontopyge Obenberger, 1926
 Sphenoptera oertzeni Jakovlev, 1887
 Sphenoptera ogowensis Obenberger, 1926
 Sphenoptera olifantina Obenberger, 1939
 Sphenoptera olivacea Kraatz in Heyden & Kraatz, 1882
 Sphenoptera olivaceovirens Obenberger, 1926
 Sphenoptera olivieri Obenberger, 1924
 Sphenoptera olivina Obenberger, 1916
 Sphenoptera omercooperi Théry, 1937
 Sphenoptera opaca (Klug in Dejean, 1833)
 Sphenoptera operosa Kerremans, 1914
 Sphenoptera ophthalmica Obenberger, 1926
 Sphenoptera ophthalmoedra Obenberger, 1926
 Sphenoptera oporina Jakovlev, 1903
 Sphenoptera oresigena Obenberger, 1926
 Sphenoptera oresitropha Obenberger, 1927
 Sphenoptera orichalcea (Pallas, 1781)
 Sphenoptera orientalis Gory & Laporte, 1839
 Sphenoptera orion Jakovlev, 1902
 Sphenoptera ornaticollis Kerremans, 1913
 Sphenoptera ornatifrons Jakovlev, 1902
 Sphenoptera orthoglypta Antoine, 1953
 Sphenoptera ostenta Jakovlev, 1908
 Sphenoptera ostentator Kerremans, 1909
 Sphenoptera ottomana Obenberger, 1927
 Sphenoptera ovata Alexeev, 1978
 Sphenoptera pacifica Kerremans, 1913
 Sphenoptera palisoti Obenberger, 1930
 Sphenoptera pallasia (Schönherr, 1817)
 Sphenoptera paradoxa Abeille de Perrin, 1898
 Sphenoptera parafulgens Obenberger, 1963
 Sphenoptera parallela Gory & Laporte, 1839
 Sphenoptera parallelicollis Kerremans, 1913
 Sphenoptera parallelithorax Obenberger, 1926
 Sphenoptera parens Kerremans, 1913
 Sphenoptera parumpunctata (Klug, 1829)
 Sphenoptera parvula (Fabricius, 1798)
 Sphenoptera parysatis Obenberger, 1929
 Sphenoptera pascali Obenberger, 1926
 Sphenoptera pauper Kerremans, 1913
 Sphenoptera pavida Obenberger, 1926
 Sphenoptera pavonia Théry, 1946
 Sphenoptera percontatrix Obenberger, 1926
 Sphenoptera peringueyi Kerremans, 1913
 Sphenoptera perpusilla Obenberger, 1926
 Sphenoptera perroteti Guérin-Ménéville, 1840
 Sphenoptera perstriata Kerremans, 1899
 Sphenoptera pflegeri Obenberger, 1926
 Sphenoptera pharao Gory & Laporte, 1839
 Sphenoptera pharia Chevrolat, 1838
 Sphenoptera pici Théry, 1930
 Sphenoptera piciana Obenberger, 1926
 Sphenoptera pierrei Descarpentries, 1958
 Sphenoptera pilipes Jakovlev, 1886
 Sphenoptera pilosula Jakovlev, 1887
 Sphenoptera pilula Kerremans, 1913
 Sphenoptera pimenteli Théry, 1946
 Sphenoptera pisciformis Thomson, 1878
 Sphenoptera piscis Kerremans, 1898
 Sphenoptera placabilis Obenberger, 1926
 Sphenoptera plagifera (Fairmaire, 1884)
 Sphenoptera plagulosa Obenberger, 1926
 Sphenoptera planidorsa Kerremans, 1913
 Sphenoptera plena Obenberger, 1952
 Sphenoptera plicata Kerremans, 1898
 Sphenoptera pliginskii Obenberger, 1927
 Sphenoptera plumbeovirens Obenberger, 1926
 Sphenoptera plumbiventris Théry, 1941
 Sphenoptera popovii Mannerheim, 1852
 Sphenoptera poriensis Obenberger, 1928
 Sphenoptera porrecta Jakovlev, 1908
 Sphenoptera portentosa Obenberger, 1926
 Sphenoptera postsata Obenberger, 1926
 Sphenoptera potamica Obenberger, 1926
 Sphenoptera praesignis Obenberger, 1926
 Sphenoptera praevalens Obenberger, 1926
 Sphenoptera prasadi Holynski, 1981
 Sphenoptera prava Kerremans, 1909
 Sphenoptera pretoriensis Kerremans, 1911
 Sphenoptera proba Kerremans, 1913
 Sphenoptera problematica Obenberger, 1930
 Sphenoptera prolata Kerremans, 1914
 Sphenoptera promontorii Obenberger, 1926
 Sphenoptera promulgeta Obenberger, 1926
 Sphenoptera propinqua Kraatz in Heyden & Kraatz, 1882
 Sphenoptera prorsa Kerremans, 1914
 Sphenoptera prullierei Abeille de Perrin, 1900
 Sphenoptera pseudochalybaea Richter, 1945
 Sphenoptera pseudounidentata Alexeev in Alexeev, et al., 1991
 Sphenoptera puberula Jakovlev, 1887
 Sphenoptera pubescens Jakovlev, 1886
 Sphenoptera punctata Kerremans, 1898
 Sphenoptera punctatissima Reitter, 1895
 Sphenoptera puncticollis Kerremans, 1919
 Sphenoptera punctisternum Obenberger, 1924
 Sphenoptera punjabensis Obenberger, 1926
 Sphenoptera pura Kerremans, 1914
 Sphenoptera purpuratrix Obenberger, 1926
 Sphenoptera purpurea Kerremans, 1913
 Sphenoptera purpurifera Walker, 1871
 Sphenoptera purpuriventris Kraatz in Heyden & Kraatz, 1882
 Sphenoptera pusillima Obenberger, 1926
 Sphenoptera puta Marseul, 1866
 Sphenoptera pyristoma Obenberger, 1916
 Sphenoptera pyrogastrica Thomson, 1879
 Sphenoptera quadraticollis Gerstäcker, 1871
 Sphenoptera quezeli Descarpentries & Bruneau de Miré, 1963
 Sphenoptera quinquepunctata Gory & Laporte, 1839
 Sphenoptera rabaiensis Théry, 1941
 Sphenoptera radicicola Obenberger, 1929
 Sphenoptera radja Obenberger, 1926
 Sphenoptera rangnowi Kerremans, 1909
 Sphenoptera raphelisi Obenberger, 1926
 Sphenoptera rauca (Fabricius, 1787)
 Sphenoptera rectipennis Kerremans, 1898
 Sphenoptera refulgens Théry, 1946
 Sphenoptera relegata Obenberger, 1926
 Sphenoptera remetita Obenberger, 1926
 Sphenoptera remota Jakovlev, 1902
 Sphenoptera renisa Obenberger, 1926
 Sphenoptera renuntiata Obenberger, 1926
 Sphenoptera repetekensis Obenberger, 1927
 Sphenoptera reposita Obenberger, 1926
 Sphenoptera restricta Kerremans, 1914
 Sphenoptera rhodesiae Théry, 1931
 Sphenoptera rhodesiana Kerremans, 1914
 Sphenoptera ringleri Obenberger, 1926
 Sphenoptera robusta Kerremans, 1913
 Sphenoptera robustithoracis Zykov & Alexeev, 1993
 Sphenoptera rothkirchi Obenberger, 1926
 Sphenoptera rothschildi Théry, 1909
 Sphenoptera rotroui Théry, 1930
 Sphenoptera rotrouiana Cobos, 1964
 Sphenoptera rotundicollis Gory & Laporte, 1839
 Sphenoptera rowumensis Obenberger, 1926
 Sphenoptera ruficornis Obenberger, 1926
 Sphenoptera rugosicollis Kerremans, 1898
 Sphenoptera rugulosa Faldermann, 1835
 Sphenoptera ruspolii Kerremans, 1913
 Sphenoptera rwindiensis Théry, 1948
 Sphenoptera sabakiensis Théry, 1941
 Sphenoptera sagax Obenberger, 1920
 Sphenoptera sagda Théry, 1931
 Sphenoptera sagittula Obenberger, 1963
 Sphenoptera saharensis Obenberger, 1924
 Sphenoptera salamita Kerremans, 1913
 Sphenoptera sancta Reitter, 1890
 Sphenoptera sarda Théry, 1932
 Sphenoptera sata Kerremans, 1913
 Sphenoptera saundersi Kerremans, 1913
 Sphenoptera saxosa Kerremans, 1909
 Sphenoptera scaura Jakovlev, 1902
 Sphenoptera scebelica Théry, 1928
 Sphenoptera schencki Kerremans, 1913
 Sphenoptera schimmeli Niehuis, 2005
 Sphenoptera schneideri Reitter, 1898
 Sphenoptera schoutedeni Kerremans, 1913
 Sphenoptera schultzei Kerremans, 1908
 Sphenoptera schwarzenbergi Obenberger, 1963
 Sphenoptera scintillatrix Obenberger, 1926
 Sphenoptera scovitzii (Faldermann, 1835)
 Sphenoptera sculpticollis Heyden, 1886
 Sphenoptera scutellaris Kerremans, 1913
 Sphenoptera sebakwensis Obenberger, 1926
 Sphenoptera seeldrayersi Kerremans, 1903
 Sphenoptera segregata Jakovlev, 1900
 Sphenoptera sekerai Obenberger, 1926
 Sphenoptera semenovi Jakovlev, 1889
 Sphenoptera semistriata (Palisot de Beauvois, 1807)
 Sphenoptera semiusta Obenberger, 1926
 Sphenoptera senegalensis Gory & Laporte, 1839
 Sphenoptera senegalorum Obenberger, 1926
 Sphenoptera sensitiva Obenberger, 1926
 Sphenoptera seriatopunctata Obenberger, 1926
 Sphenoptera serienotata Obenberger, 1926
 Sphenoptera serripes Jakovlev, 1900
 Sphenoptera serva Obenberger, 1926
 Sphenoptera servistana Obenberger, 1929
 Sphenoptera seyali Descarpentries & Bruneau de Miré, 1963
 Sphenoptera shindandensis Alexeev in Alexeev, et al., 1991
 Sphenoptera shiratensis Obenberger, 1963
 Sphenoptera siamensis Obenberger, 1926
 Sphenoptera sibuti Théry, 1931
 Sphenoptera sica Obenberger, 1926
 Sphenoptera sicardi Théry, 1931
 Sphenoptera signata Jakovlev, 1887
 Sphenoptera signifera Jakovlev, 1898
 Sphenoptera sikha Obenberger, 1926
 Sphenoptera simonsi Kerremans, 1913
 Sphenoptera simplex Jakovlev, 1893
 Sphenoptera sinuosa (Gory & Laporte, 1839)
 Sphenoptera siwaensis Descarpentries, 1954
 Sphenoptera sjoestedti Kerremans, 1908
 Sphenoptera smaragdifrons Escalera, 1914
 Sphenoptera smaragdipes Obenberger, 1926
 Sphenoptera smithi Kerremans, 1913
 Sphenoptera smyrneensis Gory, 1841
 Sphenoptera sobrina Jakovlev, 1886
 Sphenoptera socrus Obenberger, 1926
 Sphenoptera solida Jakovlev, 1902
 Sphenoptera somalorum Obenberger, 1926
 Sphenoptera somchetica Kolenati, 1846
 Sphenoptera somereni Théry, 1941
 Sphenoptera soror Kerremans, 1913
 Sphenoptera soudeki Obenberger, 1926
 Sphenoptera sphaerocephala Jakovlev, 1887
 Sphenoptera sphinx (Germar, 1842)
 Sphenoptera spicula Jakovlev, 1902
 Sphenoptera splendidiventris Théry, 1946
 Sphenoptera splendidula Gory & Laporte, 1839
 Sphenoptera splichali Obenberger, 1914
 Sphenoptera spreta Jakovlev, 1900
 Sphenoptera staneki Obenberger, 1952
 Sphenoptera stanleyi Obenberger, 1926
 Sphenoptera staudingeri Kerremans, 1913
 Sphenoptera staudingeriana Obenberger, 1920
 Sphenoptera steinheili Obenberger, 1926
 Sphenoptera stenophthalma Jakovlev, 1900
 Sphenoptera stichai Obenberger, 1926
 Sphenoptera stolida Théry, 1932
 Sphenoptera striata Gory & Laporte, 1839
 Sphenoptera striatipennis Jakovlev, 1885
 Sphenoptera striolata Gory & Laporte, 1839
 Sphenoptera stupida Théry, 1930
 Sphenoptera subarmata Kerremans, 1913
 Sphenoptera subcostata Mulsant, 1851
 Sphenoptera sublevis Kerremans, 1898
 Sphenoptera submutica Thomson, 1878
 Sphenoptera subnitida Kerremans, 1898
 Sphenoptera subobesa Kerremans, 1899
 Sphenoptera subparallela Kerremans, 1903
 Sphenoptera substriata (Krynicky, 1834)
 Sphenoptera subsulcatula Obenberger, 1926
 Sphenoptera subtilis Jakovlev, 1898
 Sphenoptera subtricostata Kraatz in Heyden & Kraatz, 1882
 Sphenoptera subviolacea (Gory & Laporte, 1839)
 Sphenoptera sudanensis Obenberger, 1926
 Sphenoptera sudanicola Obenberger, 1927
 Sphenoptera sulcata (Fischer von Waldheim, 1824)
 Sphenoptera sulcicollis (Gory & Laporte, 1839)
 Sphenoptera sulciventris Jakovlev, 1886
 Sphenoptera surcoufi Théry, 1931
 Sphenoptera surobayensis Alexeev in Alexeev, et al., 1991
 Sphenoptera suvorovi Jakovlev, 1908
 Sphenoptera swynnertoni Kerremans, 1913
 Sphenoptera syriaca Jakovlev, 1908
 Sphenoptera tamaricis (Klug, 1829)
 Sphenoptera tamarisci Gory & Laporte, 1839
 Sphenoptera tamerlani Obenberger, 1929
 Sphenoptera tantilla Fåhraeus in Boheman, 1851
 Sphenoptera tappesi Marseul, 1866
 Sphenoptera tenax Jakovlev, 1902
 Sphenoptera tenera Obenberger, 1926
 Sphenoptera tenuola Obenberger, 1926
 Sphenoptera terrena Obenberger, 1926
 Sphenoptera terrigena Obenberger, 1926
 Sphenoptera tessmanni Obenberger, 1926
 Sphenoptera testata Obenberger, 1926
 Sphenoptera tetarae Obenberger, 1926
 Sphenoptera tetraodon Obenberger, 1920
 Sphenoptera tezcani Niehuis, 1999
 Sphenoptera thelwalli Kerremans, 1913
 Sphenoptera theryana Jakovlev, 1903
 Sphenoptera tibestica Descarpentries & Bruneau de Miré, 1963
 Sphenoptera tibialis Jakovlev, 1886
 Sphenoptera tiesleri Kerremans, 1913
 Sphenoptera tigridis Obenberger, 1927
 Sphenoptera tinctipennis Obenberger, 1926
 Sphenoptera tolerans Kerremans, 1914
 Sphenoptera tombuctana Obenberger, 1924
 Sphenoptera tomentosa Jakovlev, 1886
 Sphenoptera tondui Théry, 1911
 Sphenoptera tragacanthae (Klug, 1829)
 Sphenoptera transvalensis Kerremans, 1913
 Sphenoptera trepida Fåhraeus in Boheman, 1851
 Sphenoptera trispinosa (Klug, 1829)
 Sphenoptera tristicula Reitter, 1895
 Sphenoptera tristis Jakovlev, 1886
 Sphenoptera trisulcata Reiche & Saulcy, 1856
 Sphenoptera tschoffeni Kerremans, 1898
 Sphenoptera tshitscherini Jakovlev, 1900
 Sphenoptera tuarega Obenberger, 1926
 Sphenoptera tumida Jakovlev, 1902
 Sphenoptera tutankhameni Obenberger, 1924
 Sphenoptera tyli Obenberger, 1926
 Sphenoptera ubarchangajensis Cobos, 1968
 Sphenoptera ugandae Kerremans, 1910
 Sphenoptera ugriana Kerremans, 1907
 Sphenoptera uhehensis Obenberger, 1926
 Sphenoptera umbrata Kerremans, 1913
 Sphenoptera usitor Kerremans, 1914
 Sphenoptera valida Jakovlev, 1902
 Sphenoptera validiapex Thomson, 1879
 Sphenoptera vansoni Théry, 1955
 Sphenoptera varia Jakovlev, 1887
 Sphenoptera vediensis Kalashian, 1994
 Sphenoptera ventrisculpta Obenberger, 1916
 Sphenoptera vestita Jakovlev, 1887
 Sphenoptera veterana Kerremans, 1914
 Sphenoptera vetusta (Gory & Laporte, 1839)
 Sphenoptera vicina Kerremans, 1913
 Sphenoptera vidua Jakovlev, 1900
 Sphenoptera viduola Obenberger, 1926
 Sphenoptera vimmeri Obenberger, 1926
 Sphenoptera vinosa Kerremans, 1913
 Sphenoptera violacea Jakovlev, 1898
 Sphenoptera violaceipennis Théry, 1955
 Sphenoptera viridiaurea Kraatz in Heyden & Kraatz, 1882
 Sphenoptera viridiceps Abeille de Perrin, 1891
 Sphenoptera viridicoerulea Kraatz in Heyden & Kraatz, 1882
 Sphenoptera viridicollis Théry, 1923
 Sphenoptera viridiflua Marseul, 1866
 Sphenoptera viridimicans Kerremans, 1913
 Sphenoptera viridula Jakovlev, 1905
 Sphenoptera vitiosa Théry, 1946
 Sphenoptera vittaticollis Lucas, 1844
 Sphenoptera vlastae Kalashian & Volkovitsh, 2006
 Sphenoptera vultuosa Théry, 1946
 Sphenoptera vylderi Kerremans, 1913
 Sphenoptera wahlbergi Kerremans, 1913
 Sphenoptera waltersi Bellamy, 2004
 Sphenoptera waynei Bellamy, 2004
 Sphenoptera wenigi Obenberger, 1926
 Sphenoptera willowmorensis Obenberger, 1926
 Sphenoptera wilmsi Obenberger, 1926
 Sphenoptera wittei Théry, 1948
 Sphenoptera zambesiana Kerremans, 1913
 Sphenoptera zambesiensis Obenberger, 1926
 Sphenoptera zanzibarica Thomson, 1878
 Sphenoptera zarudniana Volkovitsh & Kalashian, 2003
 Sphenoptera zarudnyi Jakovlev, 1900
 Sphenoptera zhelochovtsevi Alexeev, 1978
 Sphenoptera zoufali Obenberger, 1926
 Sphenoptera zuluana Kerremans, 1914
 Sphenoptera zulucaffra Obenberger, 1926

References

Buprestidae genera